Corixidea major is a species of jumping soil bug in the family Schizopteridae. It is found in North America.

References

Schizopteridae
Articles created by Qbugbot
Insects described in 1925